McCampbell–Porter Airport  is a county-owned, public-use airport in San Patricio County, Texas, United States. It is located two nautical miles (4 km) north of the central business district of Ingleside, Texas. Formerly known as T. P. McCampbell Airport, it is included in the National Plan of Integrated Airport Systems for 2011–2015, which categorized it as a general aviation facility.

Although most U.S. airports use the same three-letter location identifier for the FAA and IATA, this airport is assigned TFP by the FAA but has no designation from the IATA.

Facilities and aircraft 
McCampbell–Porter Airport covers an area of 231 acres (93 ha) at an elevation of 18 feet (5 m) above mean sea level. It has one runway designated 13/31 with an asphalt surface measuring 5,000 by 75 feet (1,524 x 23 m).

For the 12-month period ending March 4, 2011, the airport had 11,100 general aviation aircraft operations, an average of 30 per day. At that time there were 50 aircraft based at this airport: 92% single-engine and 8% multi-engine.

References

External links 
 Skye FBO, the fixed-base operator
  at Texas DOT Airport Directory
 Aerial image as of January 1995 from USGS The National Map
 

Airports in Texas
Transportation in San Patricio County, Texas